Anton Boucher is a former professional strongman competitor from Namibia. Anton was a finalist in the 1994 World's Strongest Man at just 21 years of age. He began competing in 1992 and won many titles as a junior. Allegedly, Anton could press 250 lb overhead at the age of 14.

References 

Living people
South African strength athletes
Namibian strength athletes
1973 births